Before the Party is a mixtape by Chris Brown released in 2015.

Before the Party may also refer to:

"Before the Party" (short story), a short story in the collection The Casuarina Tree (1926), by W. Somerset Maugham
Before the Party (play) (1949), an adaptation of the short story for theatre by Rodney Ackland
Before the Party (TV series) (1969), a TV series based on Maugham's story